Patterson High School is located in the town of Patterson in Stanislaus County, California. It is in the Patterson Joint Unified School District.

The school is known for the Aztec Calendar mural on the library wall painted by Circulo de Hombres.

Programs
Patterson High School offers many athletic, agricultural, and performing art programs. Music programs include marching band, concert band, choir, orchestra, color guard, winter guard, and winter percussion ensemble.

References

Notable alumni
, former semi-professional CS:GO player

External links
Patterson High School

High schools in Stanislaus County, California
Public high schools in California